Netamabad (also Romanized as Neṭāmābād; also known as Nez̧āmābād, Nez̧āmābād-e Fāreghān, Nez̧āmābād Fāreghān, and Nizāmābād) is a village in Fareghan Rural District, Fareghan District, Hajjiabad County, Hormozgan Province, Iran. At the 2006 census, its population was 127, in 31 families.

References 

Populated places in Hajjiabad County